Midway is an unincorporated community in Hawkins County, Tennessee, United States.

References

Unincorporated communities in Hawkins County, Tennessee
Unincorporated communities in Tennessee